Lode Parish is an administrative unit of Valmiera Municipality in the Vidzeme region of Latvia.

Towns, villages and settlements of Lode parish 
Lode (parish center)
Arakste

See also
Rūjiena (town)
Ipiķi Parish
Jeri Parish
Vilpulka Parish

Parishes of Latvia
Valmiera Municipality
Vidzeme